Hackelia setosa is a species of flowering plant in the borage family known by the common name bristly stickseed. It is native to the Klamath Mountains of northern California and southern Oregon, United States, and it is also known from Sierra Valley to the southeast of that range. It grows in open and wooded habitat. It is a hairy perennial herb up to about 60 centimeters tall. Most of the leaves are located around the base of the plant, reaching up to 22 centimeters long. Leaves higher on the stem are shorter and narrower. The hairy inflorescence is an open array of branches, each a coiling panicle of white-throated blue flowers. The fruit is a cluster of prickly nutlets.

External links
Jepson Manual Treatment
Photo gallery

setosa
Flora of California
Flora of Oregon
Flora without expected TNC conservation status